Ricardo Catalá Salgado Junior (born 28 April 1982), known as Ricardo Catalá, is a Brazilian professional football manager, currently in charge of Mirassol.

Career
Of Catalan heritage, Catalá's first senior job was at CE Europa's Cadete A squad in 2005. He left the club in 2007, and joined Audax in the following year, being appointed in charge of the under-17s.

On 13 November 2013, Catalá joined Maurício Barbieri's staff as an assistant at Red Bull Brasil. On 11 October 2017, he was appointed as manager for the ensuing campaign, but was sacked the following 3 September after a run of poor results.

On 23 April 2019, Catalá was named at the helm of Mirassol. On 6 November, after reaching the semifinals of the year's Copa Paulista (the club's best-ever position in the tournament), he renewed his contract for a further year.

Catalá took Mirassol to the semifinals of the 2020 Campeonato Paulista, despite losing 18 first team players due to the COVID-19 pandemic. On 29 August, he replaced sacked Thiago Carpini at the helm of Guarani, but was himself dismissed on 7 October.

On 29 December 2020, Catalá was announced at the helm of São Bernardo. The following 1 October, after winning the Campeonato Paulista Série A2, he left the club and took over Operário Ferroviário in the second division.

On 19 March 2022, Catalá left Operário in a mutual agreement, and returned to Mirassol just hours later.

Honours

Club
São Bernardo
Campeonato Paulista Série A2: 2021

Mirassol
Campeonato Brasileiro Série C: 2022

Individual
Campeonato Paulista Best Manager: 2020

References

External links
LinkedIn profile 

1982 births
Living people
Sportspeople from São Paulo
Brazilian football managers
Campeonato Brasileiro Série B managers
Red Bull Brasil managers
Mirassol Futebol Clube managers
Guarani FC managers
São Bernardo Futebol Clube managers
Operário Ferroviário Esporte Clube managers